Emily Chepar Kimuria (born 10 June 1975) is a Kenyan long-distance runner, who came second at the 2003 Berlin Marathon. She won the 2004 Hamburg Marathon and the 2005 Venice Marathon.

Career
Kimuria came second at the 2003 Berlin Marathon, in a time of 2:28:18. In 2004, Kimuria won the Hamburg Marathon in a time of 2:28:57. She won the race by one second from fellow Kenyan Alice Chelangat. It was her first marathon win. In the same year, she came second at the Amsterdam Marathon in a time of 2:29:45. In 2005, she won the Venice Marathon, after breaking away from Ethiopian Leila Aman after .

In 2006, Kimuria came third at the Singapore Marathon, and won the Greifenseelauf road race in Switzerland. In 2008, she came second at the Prague Marathon, in a time of 2:35:55. In 2009, Kimuria came third at the Amsterdam Marathon.

References

External links
 World Athletics

1975 births
Living people
Kenyan female marathon runners
Kenyan female long-distance runners
21st-century Kenyan women